Max Wall (12 March 1908 – 21 May 1990) was an English actor and comedian whose performing career covered music hall, films, television and theatre.

Early years
Wall was born Maxwell George Lorimer, son of the successful music hall entertainer Jack (Jock) Lorimer, a Scottish comedy actor from Forfar, known for his songs and dancing, and his wife Stella (born Maud Clara Mitchison). He was born near the Oval, at 37 Glenshaw Mansions, Brixton Road, London SW9. In 1916, during a World War I air raid, Max and his elder brother Alex were saved from death by a cast-iron bed frame, but his younger brother Bunty and their Aunt Betty, who was looking after them, were killed by a bomb dropped from a German Zeppelin which also destroyed their house.

Max and Alex went to live with their father and his family, whilst their mother went to live with Harry Wallace, whom she had met on tour. When their father died of tuberculosis in 1920, aged 37, their mother married Harry Wallace, and they all moved to a pub in Essex.

Career

Early career
Wall auditioned for a part with a touring theatre company, and made his stage début at the age of 14 as Jack in Mother Goose with a travelling pantomime company in Devon and Cornwall featuring George Lacey. In 1925 he was a speciality dancer in the London Revue at the Lyceum.  He became determined not to rely on his father's name, so abbreviated Maxwell to Max, and his stepfather's name Wallace, to Wall.

He is best remembered for his ludicrously attired and hilariously strutting Professor Wallofski. John Cleese has acknowledged Wall's influence on his own "Ministry of Silly Walks" sketch for Monty Python's Flying Circus. After appearing in many musicals and stage comedies in the 1930s, Wall's career went into decline, and he was reduced to working in obscure nightclubs. He then joined the Royal Air Force during World War II and served for three years until he was invalided out in 1943.

Wall married dancer Marion Pola and the couple had five children. In an interview with the family in the mid-1950s, Tit-Bits magazine wrote: "The kind of private jokes you find in all the nicest families flourish with the Walls. After Max and his wife, Marion, had their first son, Michael, it seemed kind of natural to make a corner in names beginning with 'M', and there are now Melvyn (aged nine), Martin (nearly five) and the four-month-old twins Meredith and Maxine. ... In the same way, because the Walls, like other couples married during the war, were eventually thrilled when they found a house with four walls of their own, they decided to call it just that, only Martin arrived and made it 'Five Walls'."

In a rare outing to the musical stage he played Hines in the original London production of The Pajama Game, which opened at the London Coliseum in October 1955 and ran for 588 performances. In that year he began an affair with Jennifer Chimes, the 1955 Miss Great Britain. He divorced his wife and married Jennifer in 1956. The relationship attracted widespread press condemnation. In 1957 Wall experienced mental health issues that affected his work. Jennifer and Max divorced in 1962.

Re-emergence
In 1966, he appeared as Père Ubu in Jarry's Ubu Roi, and in 1972 he toured with Mott the Hoople on their "Rock n' Roll Circus Tour", gaining a new audience. Wall re-emerged during the 1970s when producers and directors rediscovered his comic talents, along with the expressive power of his tragic clown face and the distinctive sad falling cadences of his voice. He secured television appearances and, having attracted Samuel Beckett's attention, he won parts in Waiting for Godot in 1979 and Krapp's Last Tape in 1984. His straight acting gained him this review in 1974: "Max Wall makes Olivier look like an amateur in The Entertainer at Greenwich Theatre...".

He also appeared in Crossroads (as Walter Soper, 1982 to 1983), Coronation Street (as Harry Payne, 1978) and what was then Emmerdale Farm (as Arthur Braithwaite, 1978). He played ex-con Ernie Dodds in Minder in 1982, with George Cole.

But the stage renaissance was offset by domestic sadness. His children were estranged from him and the taxman lost patience and declared him bankrupt.

Later work
Wall played one of the inventors in the 1968 film Chitty Chitty Bang Bang and in 1977 he was seen as King Bruno the Questionable in Terry Gilliam's film Jabberwocky. In the 1970s and 80s, Wall occasionally performed a one-man stage show, Aspects of Max Wall, in which he recaptured the humour of old-time music hall theatre.

On 1 April 1977, Wall's version of Ian Dury's song "England's Glory" (which featured in Dury's stage show Apples) was issued on Stiff Records (BUY 12), backed with "Dream Tobacco" and given away with the album Hits Greatest Stiffs. Wall also appeared onstage with Dury at the Hammersmith Odeon in 1978, but was poorly received, and said "They only want the walk".

In 1981, Wall played "Ernie", a central character in the Minder TV series episode "The Birdman of Wormwood Scrubs".

Between 1982 and 1984 he appeared as Tombs in the BBC Two adaptation of Jane based on the Daily Mirror comic-strip character and filmed with similar "comic-strip frames". In the second series his place in the castlist was upgraded to second, after Glynis Barber.
He also appeared in Thames Televisions 1978 12 part series, Born and Bred, as retired music hall legend Tommy Tonsley, trying with various degrees of success, to keep his huge south London family in line. Unfortunately, this little gem is largely forgotten and there are no plans to release a DVD or re-show on TV.

His last film appearance was in 1989 in the 12-minute film A Fear of Silence, a dark tale of a man who drives a stranger to a confession of murder by answering only "yes" or "no" to his questions; those two words, repeated, were his only dialogue.  The film won a gold award in the New York Film and TV Festival.

Death

On the afternoon of 20 May 1990 Wall fell at Simpson's-in-the-Strand in central London, fracturing his skull. He was conveyed by ambulance to Westminster Hospital in an unconscious state, but never regained consciousness, and died there early in the next morning, at the age of 82. His body was buried at Highgate Cemetery.

Wall had four sons, Michael, Melvyn, Martin and Meredith, and a daughter, Maxine.

Legacy
There is a Max Wall Society, which aims to perpetuate his memory. In 2006 the Society placed an unofficial blue plaque on Wall's birthplace in South London.

Filmography

References

External links

 
 New York Times Obituary
 Max Wall's grandfather Will Mitcham and family

1908 births
1990 deaths
Burials at Highgate Cemetery
Accidental deaths in London
Accidental deaths from falls
English male film actors
English male comedians
English people of Scottish descent
English male soap opera actors
English male stage actors
Music hall performers
People from Brixton
20th-century English male actors
20th-century English comedians
British male comedy actors
Royal Air Force personnel of World War II